Lecanora achroa is a species of crustose lichen in the family Lecanoraceae. It was originally described in 1876 by Finnish botanist William Nylander from specimens collected in Rodrigues, Mauritius. The lichen is found in Australia, New Zealand, Papua New Guinea, and North and South America.

Description

Lecanora achroa has a yellowish gray to greenish gray, crustose thallus that lies atop a blackish-brown prothallus. The ascospores are more or less ellipsoid in shape, measuring 10.5–16.5 by 6.5–8.6 μm.

The major secondary compounds found in Lecanora achroa are atranorin, 2'-O-methylperlatolic acid, and usnic acid. Species with a similar morphology include Lecanora helva and Lecanora leprosa, since both of them also have small apothecia with orange-brown discs. The Brazilian lichen Lecanora parachroa has morphological and anatomical features that are quite similar to L. achroa, but it differs in secondary chemistry, as it produces neither usnic acid nor 2′-O-methylperlatolic acid.

See also
List of Lecanora species

References

achroa
Lichen species
Lichens described in 1876
Lichens of Australia
Lichens of New Zealand
Lichens of North America
Lichens of New Guinea
Lichens of South America
Taxa named by William Nylander (botanist)